The Ankarafantsika Formation is a Late Cretaceous (Cenomanian) geologic formation of the Mahajanga Basin in the Boeny region of Madagascar, Africa. The fine-grained sandstones of the formation were deposited in a fluvial to lacustrine environment.

Fossil content 
The following fossils have been reported from the formation:
 Sauropoda indet.

See also 
 List of dinosaur-bearing rock formations
 List of stratigraphic units with indeterminate dinosaur fossils
 List of fossiliferous stratigraphic units in Madagascar
 Geology of Madagascar

References 

Geologic formations of Madagascar
Upper Cretaceous Series of Africa
Cretaceous Madagascar
Cenomanian Stage
Sandstone formations
Fluvial deposits
Lacustrine deposits
Paleontology in Madagascar
Formations